Takeshi Miyazawa (born April 19, 1978) is a comic book artist who was born in Canada and attended Queen's University in Ontario to study art. His art style incorporates a manga sensibility.

Bibliography
Incomplete comic book checklist:
Empowered Special: Nine Beers with Ninjette (Dark Horse)
Generation Hope #16–17 (Marvel)
Lost Planet Bound Raven #1–2 (Dengeki Comics EX)
Mary Jane #1–4 (Marvel)
Mary Jane: Homecoming (Marvel)
"Mastermind Excello" in Amazing Fantasy (2004 series) #15 (Marvel)
Mech Cadet Yu #1–12 (Boom! Studios)
Ms. Marvel (Vol. 4) #3, 8, 10–12, 14–17 (Marvel)
Robotech: Invasion #1–5 (DC Comics/Wildstorm)
Runaways (Vol. 1) #11–12 (Marvel)
Runaways (Vol. 2) #7–8 (Marvel)
Runaways (Vol. 3) #7-9 (Marvel)
Secret Invasion: Young Avengers/Runaways #1–3 (Marvel)
Sidekicks #1–3, Sidekicks published by Oni Press and the story set in the same universe "Crash Course" in the series Love and Tights #1, published by Slave Labor Graphics
Spider-Man Loves Mary Jane #1–15 (Marvel)
Spider-Man Unlimited #1 (Marvel)
Ultimate Comics: Spider-Man #7–8 (Marvel)
Uncanny X-Men #434 (Marvel)
X-Men Unlimited #42 (Marvel)
Spider-Gwen: Ghost-Spider #5–10 (Marvel)
Ghost-Spider #1– (Marvel)
Silk (Vol. 3) #1–5 (Marvel)
Silk (Vol. 4) #1– (Marvel)

Incomplete trade paperback checklist:
Mary Jane Vol. 1: Circle Of Friends (digest size)
Mary Jane Vol. 2: Homecoming (digest size)
Spider-Man Loves Mary Jane Vol. 1: Super Crush (digest size)
Spider-Gwen:Ghost-Spider Vol. 2: The Impossible Year

References

External links
Factory 9ine, Miyazawa's official website

Takeshi Miyazawa on marvel.com
Interview on Where Monsters Dwell (May, 2013)
 https://www.darkhorse.com/Comics/23-899/Empowered-Special-Nine-Beers-with-Ninjette (August 2019)

Canadian comics artists
Living people
1978 births
Canadian people of Japanese descent